Pascal Wollach (born October 16, 1987) is a male swimmer from Canada, who mostly competes in the freestyle and backstroke events. He claimed a bronze medal (4 × 200 m freestyle relay) at the 2007 Pan American Games in Rio de Janeiro, Brazil.

Wollach is now retired from swimming. He graduated in 2016 from the University of Pennsylvania, School of Dental Medicine and recently started a career in dentistry.

References
Profile Canadian Olympic Committee

1987 births
Living people
Auburn Tigers men's swimmers
Canadian male backstroke swimmers
Canadian male freestyle swimmers
People from Melfort, Saskatchewan
Sportspeople from Saskatchewan
University of Calgary alumni
Pan American Games bronze medalists for Canada
Pan American Games medalists in swimming
Swimmers at the 2007 Pan American Games
Medalists at the 2007 Pan American Games